The Championships at the Palisades is an event in the Outback Champions Series for senior tennis players. It was held from 2006 through 2009 in Charlotte, North Carolina.

Finals results

Defunct tennis tournaments in the United States
Recurring sporting events established in 2006
Champions Series (senior men's tennis tour)
Tennis tournaments in the United States
Sports competitions in Charlotte, North Carolina